"Rag Doll" is a song by the American rock band Aerosmith.  It is from their 1987 album Permanent Vacation.  It was released as the final single from the album in 1988.  It was written by Steven Tyler, Joe Perry, Jim Vallance, and Holly Knight. The song "[filters] the essence of Aerosmith's funkiest moments through the boom-thwack beat of the hair-metal '80s".

Song origin
The song's lyrics were primarily written by Tyler and Vallance, Perry originating the guitar riff, and Vallance writing the bass line.  The song was originally titled "Rag Time"; however, John Kalodner did not like that, so Holly Knight was called in to help change that lyric. She suggested "Rag Doll", which was actually another title Tyler and Vallance had considered.

Song structure
The song is notable for drummer Joey Kramer's 1-2-1-2 lead beat in the beginning of the song, Joe Perry's slide guitar, and a horn section arranged by Tom Keenlyside. The song is in B minor. The melody and lyrics to the second verse are based on the vocal countermelody of the Rolling Stones' cover of Hank Snow's "I'm Movin' On" that appears on Got Live If You Want It! in which Keith Richards sings "Yes, I'm movin'" in response to Mick Jagger singing "I'm movin' on". The music on the radio single differed from the album version in having a more urgent, driving beat, fueled by Tom Hamilton's bass, and slightly different sax notes. This version had an earlier fadeout, omitting the classic clarinet and trumpet duet behind Tyler's scat singing. The video (see below) is based on the album version of the song.

Reception
Cash Box said that "there's a spicy drum effect at the very end of this rockin', hit single,"

Tracklist

(Including Any Others Editions)

 Rag Doll (4:24)
 Rag Doll (Extended Vacation) (6:59)
 Rag Doll (Rock Mix) (4:23)
 Rag Doll (Rockappella Mix) (4:07)
 Rag Doll (Dub Version) (5:33)
 Rag Doll (Extended Vacation/LP Version) (7:15)
 Rag Doll (The All Dayparts Edit) (3:05)
 Rag Doll (Remix) (2:50)
 Rag Doll (Edit) (3:05)
 Rad Doll (Wals Version)

Charts

Notes

Cover versions
Ted Nugent
Tony Franklin
Vinnie Colaiuta
Derek Sherinian covered the song for the Aerosmith tribute album Not the Same Old Song and Dance (Eagle Records, 1999). Backing vocals were by David Glen Eisley.

References

Aerosmith songs
1988 singles
Music videos directed by Marty Callner
Songs written by Holly Knight
Songs written by Jim Vallance
Songs written by Steven Tyler
Songs written by Joe Perry (musician)
Song recordings produced by Bruce Fairbairn
Geffen Records singles
1987 songs
Glam metal songs